Aloysius Sudarso S.C.J. (born 12 December 1945) is an Indonesian Roman Catholic bishop.

Biography
Sudarso was ordained a member of the Congregation of the Priests of the Sacred Heart on 14 December 1972. On 17 November 1993, Sudarso was appointed as the Auxiliary Bishop of Palembang with the title of Titular Bavagaliana Bishop. On 25 March 1994, he was ordained bishop by Joseph Hubertus Soudant S.C.J. then the bishop of Palembang. The co-consecrators were Alfred Gonti Pius Datubara O.F.M. Cap., then the Archbishop of Medan, and Andreas Henrisusanta S.C.J., then Bishop of Tanjungkarang. On 20 May 1997, he was appointed Bishop of Palembang to continue the leadership of Soudant, whose resignation was accepted by Pope John Paul II.

On 1 July 2013 the diocese of Palembang was elevated to that of an archdiocese, and as a result Suarso's position was elevated from bishop to archbishop.

In December 2018 an autobiography of Sudarso titled "The Power of Surrender" written by Hendro Setiawan was released. Setiwan, as well as Sudarso and several other personalities were present at the book launch.

References

External links

1945 births
Living people
Javanese people
People from Yogyakarta
20th-century Roman Catholic bishops in Indonesia
21st-century Roman Catholic archbishops in Indonesia